Helen-Ann Macleod Hartley (born 28 May 1973) is a British Anglican bishop and academic who has served as the Bishop of Newcastle since 2023. She previously served as Bishop of Waikato in New Zealand from 2014 to 2017 and area Bishop of Ripon in the Diocese of Leeds from 2018 to 2023. She was the first woman to have trained as a priest in the Church of England to join the episcopate, and the third woman to become a bishop of the Anglican Church in Aotearoa, New Zealand and Polynesia.

Early life and education
Hartley was born Helen-Ann Francis on 28 May 1973 in Edinburgh, Scotland. She was baptised in Coldingham Priory, Coldingham, Berwickshire, where her father was the minister. She spent her childhood in Sunderland, England. Her father was a Church of Scotland minister but the family moved to Anglicanism in the 1980s. In 1987, her father became a Church of England priest and served in the Diocese of Durham; he was later made an honorary canon of Durham Cathedral; and Helen-Ann's mother also later became a priest. Francis was educated in Sunderland at Benedict Biscop Primary School (a Church of England primary school) and St Anthony’s Secondary School (an all-girls Roman Catholic secondary school; now St Anthony's Girls' Catholic Academy) before attending university.

She has attended a number of universities where she studied theology. She graduated from the University of St Andrews with an undergraduate Master of Theology (MTheol) degree in 1995, and from Princeton Theological Seminary (PTS) with a Master of Theology (MTh) degree in 1996. PTS is a seminary associated with the Presbyterian Church (USA). Later, she studied at the University of Oxford and graduated with a Postgraduate Diploma (PGDip) in applied theology, a Master of Philosophy (MPhil) degree in 2000, and a Doctor of Philosophy (DPhil) degree in 2005. Her DPhil thesis concerned the portrayal of manual labour in Judaism and Early Christianity, and was titled "We worked night and day that we might not burden any of you (1 Thessalonians 2:9): aspects of the portrayal of work in the Letters of Paul, late Second Temple Judaism, the Græco-Roman world and early Christianity".

Ordained ministry
Hartley is a fourth generation cleric. She was an acolyte at Durham Cathedral during her youth. She attended the Oxford Ministry Course at Ripon College Cuddesdon to undergo ministerial formation.

Hartley was ordained in the Church of England: made a deacon at Michaelmas 2005 (24 September), by Richard Harries, Bishop of Oxford, at Christ Church Cathedral, Oxford, and ordained priest the Michaelmas following (24 September 2006), by Colin Fletcher, Bishop of Dorchester, at Dorchester Abbey. She then began her ministry as a curate in a group of parishes in Wheatley, Oxfordshire. In 2007, she became curate at St Mary and St Nicholas Church, Littlemore. In addition to serving as a curate, she worked as a lecturer in New Testament studies at Ripon College Cuddesdon. She later became the theological college's Director of Biblical Studies.

In November 2011, Hartley was selected to become Dean of Tikanga Pakeha, i.e. European heritage, students at St John's College, Auckland in New Zealand. The college is co-deputised by three deans who represent the three main peoples of New Zealand: Pakeha, Maori and Polynesians. She originally went to St John's College in 2010 to research for a book, Making Sense of the Bible, before moving to New Zealand to take up the appointment of Dean in early 2012.

Episcopal ministry
In September 2013, Hartley was elected to become the seventh Bishop of Waikato. She was consecrated on 22 February 2014, by Philip Richardson, Archbishop of New Zealand (with co-primates Brown Turei, Te Pīhopa o Aotearoa, and Winston Halapua, Bishop of Polynesia, and other bishops) at St Peter's Cathedral, Hamilton (i.e. Waikato's cathedral). She was the first woman who had trained and served as a priest in the Church of England to become a bishop: at the time of her election, women couldn't be consecrated to the episcopate of the Church of England. The Diocese of Waikato and Taranaki is unique within the Anglican Communion as it is led by co-diocesan bishops: Hartley and Philip Richardson, as Bishop of Taranaki, had joint oversight of the whole diocese.

On 9 November 2017, it was announced that Hartley was to become the Bishop of Ripon, an area bishop in the Church of England Diocese of Leeds. She was duly invested (i.e. legally took the See of Ripon) and installed at Ripon Cathedral on 4 February 2018. From then until 2020, she was the youngest bishop in the Church of England; being aged 44 when she took up the appointment.

In October 2022, it was announced that Hartley would take up the post of Bishop of Newcastle in early 2023, succeeding Christine Hardman, who retired in November 2021. On 28 November 2022, she was elected by the College of Canons of Newcastle Cathedral. The confirmation of her election — by which she legally took up the See of Newcastle — took place on 3 February 2023 at York Minster.

Personal life
In 2003, Helen-Ann Francis married Myles Hartley, a musician and church organist.

Selected works

References

External links
Hartley's Twitter account

1973 births
Living people
21st-century Church of England bishops
Alumni of Ripon College Cuddesdon
Alumni of the University of Oxford
Alumni of the University of St Andrews
Anglican bishops of Waikato
Women Anglican bishops
Clergy from Edinburgh
Princeton Theological Seminary alumni
Bishops of Ripon (modern area bishops)
Bishops of Newcastle